Heritage Christian School is a private, nondenominational Christian school located in Canton, Ohio. The school occupies what was formerly Lincoln High School and serves children from preschool to 8th grade. Previously, the middle and high school, sixth to 12th grade at Heritage Christian had their sports teams nicknamed the "Conquerors." The middle and high school closed in September 2018.https://www.cantonrep.com/news/20180504/finances-force-canton-school-to-drop-grades

Notable former students
Marilyn Manson, rock musician.
Matt Hoopes, Relient K guitarist.

External links
Official Website

Christian schools in Ohio
Buildings and structures in Canton, Ohio
Nondenominational Christian schools in the United States
High schools in Stark County, Ohio
Middle schools in Stark County, Ohio
Private elementary schools in Ohio
Private middle schools in Ohio
Private high schools in Ohio